During the 1958–59 English football season, Brentford competed in the Football League Third Division. Despite 32 goals from Jim Towers and 22 from George Francis, a number of defeats to low-placed clubs early in the season prevented the Bees from finishing higher than 3rd, one place away from promotion.

Season summary 
After narrowly missing out on promotion in 1957–58, Brentford entered the 1958–59 Third Division season full of confidence. Despite making a profit of £6,789 on the previous season (equivalent to £ in ), manager Malky MacDonald decided not to add to his squad and instead planned for the future by bringing in a number of Scottish youngsters. Brentford began the season with a resounding 4–0 victory over Bradford City, hitting top spot, but dropped back after three consecutive defeats. By the time the Bees drew 1–1 with Chesterfield on 4 October 1958, the team's inconsistency could be clearly pointed to a lack of support for forwards Jim Towers and George Francis, who had scored 13 of the team's 17 goals by that point of the season. In response, manager MacDonald paid £6,000 for Luton Town's outside left George McLeod. After defeats to Stockport County and Reading in late October, the team recovered and began to perform on a consistent basis.

Brentford had a morale-boosting run to the fourth round of the FA Cup, eliminating Exeter City, King's Lynn and Barnsley on the way to a 2–0 defeat to First Division club West Bromwich Albion in front of 41,440 at The Hawthorns. A 6–0 win over Southampton at The Dell on 9 March 1959 (which set a new club record for biggest away Football League win) established the Bees as promotion contenders. Three victories and two draws from the following five matches (which included a win and a draw versus leaders Plymouth Argyle) saw Brentford increase their grip on 3rd place in the table, though at a cost to season-ending injuries to Ian Dargie and Len Newcombe. Defeats in crucial matches versus fellow promotion challengers Norwich City and Hull City in early April effectively ended the Bees' promotion charge and all hope of promotion mathematically ended with two matches left to play. Brentford finished the season in 3rd place.

Jim Towers' 37 goals scored in all competitions during the season was just two goals shy of Jack Holliday's club record of 39, set in the Third Division South in 1932–33. Towers' strike partner George Francis also finished amongst the top scorers in the Third Division, with 22 goals and 24 in all competitions. Brentford finished the 1958–59 season with the best defensive record in the Third Division, conceding only 49 goals and also conceding the fewest away goals (27). A new club record for most league away draws (10) was set during the season and the club record for fewest goalscorers in a season was equalled. The 20 players used in all competitions was the lowest since the end of the Second World War and three players finishing the season as ever-presents in all 50 matches was another post-war record.

League table

Results
Brentford's goal tally listed first.

Legend

Football League Third Division

FA Cup

 Sources: 100 Years Of Brentford, Statto, 11v11

Playing squad 
Players' ages are as of the opening day of the 1958–59 season.

 Sources: 100 Years Of Brentford, Timeless Bees

Coaching staff

Statistics

Appearances and goals

Players listed in italics left the club mid-season.
Source: 100 Years Of Brentford

Goalscorers 

Players listed in italics left the club mid-season.
Source: 100 Years Of Brentford

Management

Summary

Transfers & loans

Notes

References 

Brentford F.C. seasons
Brentford